The 2022 mayoral election in the city of Raleigh, North Carolina, was originally scheduled to be held on Tuesday, October 5, 2021, but was moved to November 8, 2022 by the passage of a law in June 2021. Incumbent mayor Mary-Ann Baldwin is seeking re-election to a second term in office. She is challenged by Terrance Ruth and DaQuanta Copeland.

Baldwin won reelection, receiving 46.7% of the vote. Ruth finished in second with 40.6% and Copeland finished third with 10.1%.

Background
Incumbent mayor Mary-Ann Baldwin was first elected in 2019 on a platform of affordable housing. The city council passed an $80 million bond to fund the construction of affordable housing via ballot initiative in November 2020, though a similar proposal to fund the construction of public parks was abandoned due to the complications of the COVID-19 pandemic. Baldwin has faced criticism over being developer-friendly and for her perceived mishandling of Black Lives Matter protests in the summer of 2020, as well as the council's decision to ask the state legislature to move the election from odd-numbered to even-numbered years without public comment.

Challenger Terrance Ruth announced his candidacy in January 2021, running on a platform of restoring public transparency, promoting engagement, and increasing affordability and equitability. He has served as a Wake County principal, a non-profit director, and is currently a professor of public policy at North Carolina State University. He received the endorsement of the Wake County Democratic Party in July 2022. He also has been endorsed by Livable Raleigh, an organization which opposes Baldwin and the city council's changes to zoning.

General election

Candidates
Filing for mayoral candidates began at noon on July 1 and ended at noon on July 15. Although the election is officially nonpartisan, all three candidates are members of the Democratic Party.

Declared
Mary-Ann Baldwin, incumbent mayor (2019–present)
Terrance Ruth, nonprofit executive director and professor at North Carolina State University
DaQuanta Copeland, vice chair of the Wake County Health and Human Services Board

Did not file
Milo Alston, local activist

Declined
Zainab Baloch, community activist, candidate for the Raleigh city council in 2017, and candidate for mayor in 2019 (running for city council district B) 
Corey Branch, city councilor (running for re-election) 
Patrick Buffkin, city councilor
David Cox, city councilor
Kay Crowder, former city councilor
Ryan Dexheimer, Student at NC State University
Stormie Forte, city councilor (running for at-large seat on city council)
Charles Francis, attorney and candidate for mayor in 2017 and 2019
George Knott, musician and candidate for mayor in 2019
Jonathan Melton, city councilor (running for re-election) 
Stef Mendell, former city councilor
David Knight, city councilor (running for re-election)
Russ Stephenson, former city councilor
Nicole Stewart, Raleigh mayor pro-temp
Caroline Sullivan, former Wake County commissioner and candidate for mayor in 2019
Justin Sutton, attorney and candidate for mayor in 2019

Endorsements

Results

References

External links
Official websites for mayoral candidates
 Mary-Ann Baldwin (D) for Mayor
 Terrance Ruth (D) for Mayor

2022
Raleigh
Raleigh